Chinese rings may refer to:

Chinese linking rings, an illusion
Baguenaudier, a puzzle also known as Chinese Rings

See also
 The Chinese Ring